Horsebread was a type of bread produced and consumed in medieval Europe. At the time, it was considered to be of low quality, made from a seasonal mix of legumes (such as dry split peas) and bran along with other non-wheat cereal grains such as oats, rye, along with maize, and acorns. It was one of the cheapest breads available. As the name suggests, it was allegedly fit only for horses to eat, but for many of the poorer people, as well as in times of famine, this bread sustained them. It was associated with poverty, since those who could afford white bread (which was the most labour-intensive, and therefore expensive, bread) considered horse bread and other breads like rye or barley breads unfit for their position in society. 

White breads were generally eaten by only the middle class and wealthy, because of the labour involved in refining flour. This is in contrast with modern whole-grain breads, which are typically seen as premium-priced health foods or gourmet foods. This is in part because modern flour has a higher gluten content than flour produced in medieval Europe, so bread made from less-refined flour is more palatable than it would have been during the Middle Ages.

See also

Brown bread – another European bread that was originally considered undesirable
Polenta – as a staple food of the poor in early modern northern Italy
Sprouted bread
Whole wheat bread

References

External links
 Mediaeval Horsebread. Elizabeth's Kitchen Diary.
 For Centuries, English Bakers’ Biggest Customers Were Horses. Atlas Obscura.

Whole wheat breads
Medieval cuisine